La Bestia humana is a 1957 Argentine film whose story is based on the 1890 novel La Bête Humaine by the French writer Émile Zola.

External links
 

1957 films
1950s Spanish-language films
Argentine black-and-white films
Films based on works by Émile Zola
Films directed by Daniel Tinayre
1950s Argentine films